In systems management, out-of-band management involves the use of management interfaces (or serial ports) for managing networking equipment. Out-of-band (OOB) management is a networking term which refers to accessing and managing network infrastructure at remote locations, and doing it through a separate management plane from the production network.  Cellular 4G and 5G networks are used today for out-of-band management and many manufacturers have it as a product offering.  Out-of-band management is now considered an essential network component to ensure business continuity. 

Out-of-band management allows the network operator to establish trust boundaries in accessing the management function to apply it to network resources. It also can be used to ensure management connectivity (including the ability to determine the status of any network component) independent of the status of other in-band network components.

In computing, one form of out-of-band management is sometimes called lights-out management (LOM) and involves the use of a dedicated management channel for device maintenance. It allows a system administrator to monitor and manage servers and other network-attached equipment by remote control regardless of whether the machine is powered on or whether an OS is installed or functional.

By contrast, in-band management through VNC or SSH is based on in-band connectivity (the usual network channel). It typically requires software that must be installed on the remote system being managed and only works after the operating system has been booted and networking is brought up. It does not allow management of remote network components independently of the current status of other network components. A classic example of this limitation is when a sysadmin attempts to reconfigure the network on a remote machine only to find themselves locked out and unable to fix the problem without physically going to the machine. Despite these limitations, in-band solutions are still common because they are simpler and much lower-cost.  

Both in-band and out-of-band management are usually done through a network connection, but an out-of-band management card can use a physically separated network connector if preferred. A remote management card usually has at least a partially independent power supply and can switch the main machine on and off through the network. Because a special device is required for each machine, out-of-bandwidth management can be much more expensive.

Serial consoles are an in-between case: they are technically OOB as they do not require the primary network to be functioning for remote administration. However, without special hardware, a serial console cannot configure the UEFI (or BIOS) settings, reinstall the operating system remotely, or fix problems that prevent the system from booting.

Purpose 
A complete remote management system allows remote reboot, shutdown, powering on; hardware sensor monitoring (fan speed, power voltages, chassis intrusion, etc.); broadcasting of video output to remote terminals and receiving of input from remote keyboard and mouse (KVM over IP). It also can access local media like a DVD drive, or disk images, from the remote machine. If necessary, this allows one to perform remote installation of the operating system. Remote management can be used to adjust BIOS settings that may not be accessible after the operating system has already booted. Settings for hardware RAID or RAM timings can also be adjusted as the management card needs no hard drives or main memory to operate.

As management via serial port has traditionally been important on servers, a complete remote management system also allows interfacing with the server through a serial over LAN cable.

As sending monitor output through the network is bandwidth intensive, cards like AMI's MegaRAC use built-in video compression (versions of VNC are often used in implementing this).
Devices like Dell DRAC also have a slot for a memory card where an administrator may keep server-related information independently from the main hard drive.

The remote system can be accessed either through an SSH command-line interface, specialized client software, or through various web-browser-based solutions. Client software is usually optimized to manage multiple systems easily.

There are also various scaled-down versions, up to devices that only allow remote reboot by power cycling the server. This helps if the operating system hangs, but only needs a reboot to recover.

Implementation 
Remote management can be enabled on many computers (not necessarily only servers) by adding a remote management card (while some cards only support a limited list of motherboards). Newer server motherboards often have built-in remote management and need no separate management card.

Internally, Ethernet-based out-of-band management can either use a dedicated separate Ethernet connection, or some kind of traffic multiplexing can be performed on the system's regular Ethernet connection. That way, a common Ethernet connection becomes shared between the computer's operating system and the integrated baseboard management controller (BMC), usually by configuring the network interface controller (NIC) to perform Remote Management Control Protocol (RMCP) ports filtering, use a separate MAC address, or to use a virtual LAN (VLAN). Thus, out-of-band nature of the management traffic is ensured in a shared-connection scenario, as the system configures the NIC to extract the management traffic from the incoming traffic flow on the hardware level, and to route it to the BMC before reaching the host and its operating system.

Remote CLI access 
An older version of out-of-band management is a layout involving the availability of a separate network that allows network administrators to get command-line interface access over the console ports of network equipment, even when those devices are not forwarding any payload traffic.

If a location has several network devices, a terminal server can provide access to different console ports for direct CLI access. In case there is only one or just a few network devices, some of them provide AUX ports making it possible to connect a dial-in modem for direct CLI access. The mentioned terminal server can often be accessed via a separate network that does not use managed switches and routers for a connection to the central site, or it has a modem connected via dial-in access through POTS or ISDN.

See also 
 Intelligent Platform Management Interface (IPMI; a server out-of-band management standard protocol)
 Redfish (specification) (a server out-of-band management standard protocol)
 Management Component Transport Protocol (MCTP; a low-level protocol used for controlling hardware components)
 Desktop and mobile Architecture for System Hardware (an out-of-band management standard protocol)
 Intel Active Management Technology (AMT; Intel's out-of-band management technology)
 AMD PRO 
 HP Integrated Lights-Out (iLO; HP's out-of-band management implementation for x86 and newer Integrity servers)
 Dell DRAC (iDRAC; DELL's out-of-band management implementation)
 IBM Remote Supervisor Adapter or Integrated Management Module (IMM; IBM's out-of-band management implementation)
 Lenovo XClarity Controller (XCC)
 Sun LOM port (Lights Out Management port) is a remote access facility on Sun servers.
 ZPE systems serial console plus ZPE systems serial console
 Opengear ("smart out-of-band infrastructure management" products)
 Perle Systems (Advanced Console Servers for secure out-of-band management of any device with a serial, USB, or Ethernet console management port)

References

External links

 
System administration